Loris Zonta (born 22 May 1997) is an Italian footballer who plays for LR Vicenza.

Club career
On 30 January 2017 he was signed by Pisa on an 18 month-loan. On 19 February 2017 he made his professional debut for Pisa as a substitute replacing Federico Angiulli in the 87th minute in the Serie B in a 0-0 home draw against Frosinone. His loan spell at Pisa ended at the start of the winter 2017–18 transfer period and Zonta returned to Bassano Virtus on a permanent transfer on 10 January 2018.

References

External links
 

1997 births
People from Bassano del Grappa
Living people
Italian footballers
Pisa S.C. players
L.R. Vicenza players
Serie B players
Serie C players
Association football midfielders
Universiade medalists in football
Universiade bronze medalists for Italy
Medalists at the 2019 Summer Universiade
Sportspeople from the Province of Vicenza
Footballers from Veneto